H-Blockx is a German rock band founded in Münster in 1991. After the success of their debut album in 1994, Time to Move, the band received a nomination for Best Breakthrough Artist at the 1995 MTV Europe Music Awards. In 1999, the World Wrestling Federation contacted them to record a song, "Oh Hell Yeah", for wrestler Stone Cold Steve Austin, and their song "Countdown to Insanity" appears in the European version of the 2007 music video game Rock Band. Between 1994 and 2012, H-Blockx released seven studio albums.

History 

The band rose to fame with their successful debut album, Time to Move, released in 1994 on Sing Sing Records, and produced by Ralph Quick and Chris Wagner. The music videos for "Risin' High" and "Move" received considerable airplay on MTV. The band earned a nomination for "Best Breakthrough Artist" at the following MTV Europe Music Awards, however, the award went to Dog Eat Dog. With the help of the singles "Risin' High", "Move", and "Little Girl", their debut spent 62 weeks in the German album chart, selling over 750,000 copies worldwide, and earning the band their first gold album. Their first major tour followed. In 1999, World Wrestling Federation contacted the band to record a song, "Oh Hell Yeah", for wrestler Stone Cold Steve Austin. Although it was never used as his theme song, it became synonymous with Austin and was released on WWF The Music, Vol. 4. A reworked version of "Oh Hell Yeah" was featured on the 2002 WWE Anthology album The Attitude Era.

None of their following albums have been as successful as Time to Move was. However, with the release of Get in the Ring in 2002 on Supersonic Records in association with BMG they did have a minor hit with their cover of "The Power" featuring rapper Turbo B; Turbo B also performs the original version with Snap!

In 2004, the band's album No Excuses reached No. 14 on the German album charts. It was then supported by an extensive European tour. In early 2005 and 2006 in Malmö, Sweden, their 2007 album Open Letter To A Friend was recorded. They were accompanied by H-Blockx producer Andreas "Boogieman" Herbig who was with them in 1994 when Time To Move was completed. Their single "Countdown to Insanity" from the album is one of the playable tracks included on the European version of the game Rock Band, and is available to download with the US version. Ending a five-year absence from the recording studio, the band released their album HBLX in May 2012.

In 2013, the band's song "Gazoline" was used for the trailer and soundtrack for the video game Sunset Overdrive, along with several other rock and metal songs.

Band members

Current members 
 Henning Wehland – vocals (1990–present)
 Tim "Humpe" Tenambergen – guitar (1990–present)
 Stephan "Gudze" Hinz – bass (1990–2003, 2007–present)
 Steffen Wilmking – drums (1999–2001, 2003–present)

Past members 
 Johann Christoph "Mason" Maass – drums (1990–1998)
 Dave Gappa – vocals (1992–2001, 2003–2005)
 Marco Minnemann – drums (1998–1999)
 Martin "Dog" Kessler – drums (2001–2003)
 Fabio Trentini – bass (2003–2007)

Timeline

Discography

Studio albums

Compilation albums

Guest appearances 
 2001 – Brennstoff by Das Department (V2 Records, "Tinitus")

Compilation appearances 
 1994 – White Magic – Soundtrack (BMG Ariola München GmbH, "Move")
 1995 – Always Music '95 (BMG Ariola Special Projects, "Move (The Radio)")
 1995 – De Afrekening Volume 9 (Columbia Records, "Move")
 1995 – Internationale Hits 95 (Ariola Records, "Risin' High")
 1995 – Just the Best Vol. 4 (Polystar Records, "Risin' High (Video Cut)")
 1995 – Just the Best Vol. 6 cassette (Polystar Records, "Little Girl (Video Version)")
 1995 – Just the Best Vol. 6 CD (Polystar Records, "Little Girl (Video Version)")
 1995 – Popcorn – Hyper Dance Power (Ariola, BMG Ariola Media GmbH, "Risin' High")
 1995 – Rockgarden Vol. 3 (EVA Belgium, "Risin' High")
 1995 – Rockgarden Volume 3 (EVA Records, "Risin' High")
 1995 – Stop Chirac (RCA Records, "Revolution")
 1995 – Top of the Pops 1 (Columbia Records, "Move")
 1995 – Wild CD 02 (Wild Magazine, "Move")
 1995 – Crossing All Over! - Vol. 3 (GUN Records, BMG, "Revolution")
 1996 – Fresh (Sonet, PolyGram Finland Oy, "Little Girl")
 1996 – Jam – Vol. 3 (BMG Ariola Hamburg GmbH, "How Do You Feel?")
 1996 – Quote 97 – Niemals Einer Meinung (Eastwest Records, "Little Girl")
 1996 – Zoo Magazine CD Sampler 04 (Zoo Magazine (DK), "How Do You Feel?")
 1997 – Bravo Super Show 1997 – Volume 4 (BMG Ariola Media GmbH, "Step Back")
 1997 – Radio FM4 Soundselection (BMG Ariola Austria GmbH, "Step Back (Loop Version)")
 1997 – Vivamania Volume 1 (Sony Music Entertainment (Germany), "Move")
 1999 – Crossing All Over! - The Classix(Supersonic Records, BMG, "Risin' High")
 1999 – Pop 2000–50 Jahre Popmusik Und Jugendkultur In Deutschland (Grönland Records,"Risin' High)
 1999 – WWF the Music Vol.4 – Oh Hell Yeah (Stone Cold Steve Austin) 2000 – Bravo Hits 29 (Warner Special Marketing GmbH, Bertelsmann Club, "Ring of Fire")
 2000 – Lords of the Boards 2000 (Modul Records, "Time Of My Life")
 2000 – The Dome Vol. 14 (BMG Ariola, "Ring Of Fire")
 2000 – Viva Hits 9 (Polystar Records, "Ring Of Fire (Video Version)")
 2001 – Monsterhits (EMM (EMI Music Media), "Ring Of Fire (Video Version)")
 2002 – Chart Boxx – Second Highlights (Top 13 Music-Club, "The Power (Single Version)")
 2002 – Fetenhits – New Rock Party (Polystar Records, "The Power")
 2002 – Pepsi Chart Album (Oy EMI Finland Ab, BMG Finland, Universal Music (Finland), "The Power")
 2002 – Rock Zone Special (BMG Russia, "How Do You Feel?")
 2004 – Off Road Tracks Vol. 80 (Metal Hammer (Germany), "Where's The Message?")
 2006 – American Chopper (EMI Electrola, "Leave Me Alone")
 2007 – Dynamit Vol. 57'' (RockHard Records, "I Don't Want You To Like Me")

Singles

See also 
 List of Sony BMG artists

References

External links 

 Official website
 H-Blockx at MySpace
 H-Blockx videography

1991 establishments in Germany
German alternative rock groups
German nu metal musical groups
MTV Europe Music Award winners
Musical groups established in 1991
Musical quartets
Pop punk groups
Rapcore groups